The Little Estate is a mansion home located at 1 Littleridge Ln. in Cherry Hills Village, Colorado. It was built in 1941 in Tudor Revival style.  The property has a pool, mature trees, and landscaping.

Its exterior walls, set upon a concrete foundation, are finished with brick laid in common bond.

See also
National Register of Historic Places listings in Arapahoe County, Colorado

References

External links 
 arapahoe-county

Tudor Revival architecture in Colorado
Houses in Arapahoe County, Colorado
Historic districts on the National Register of Historic Places in Colorado
National Register of Historic Places in Arapahoe County, Colorado